Solo is an album by jazz trombonist and arranger Kai Winding recorded in 1963 for the Verve label.

Reception

The Allmusic review by Scott Yanow observed "Trombonist Kai Winding is not here featured on unaccompanied solos despite the title of this album, but it does showcase his horn without the usual three or four trombones that he regularly used during the period. ...this is one of Winding's best (and least commercial) recordings of the 1960s".

Track listing
 "How Are Things in Glocca Morra?" (Burton Lane, Yip Harburg) - 3:00
 "Recardo (Bossa Nova)" (Luiz Antonio, Djalma Ferreira) - 3:45
 "Playboy's Theme" (Cy Coleman, Carolyn Leigh) - 2:31
 "The Things We Did Last Summer" (Jule Styne, Sammy Cahn) - 3:42
 "The Sweetest Sounds" (Richard Rodgers) - 2:47
 "Hey There" (Jerry Ross, Richard Adler) - 3:30
 "I'm Your Bunny Bossa Nova" (Kai Winding) - 2:45
 "Days of Wine and Roses" (Henry Mancini, Johnny Mercer) - 2:13
 "You've Changed" (Bill Carey, Carl T. Fischer) - 3:24
 "I Believe in You" (Frank Loesser) - 3:12
 "Capricious" (Billy Taylor) - 2:08

Personnel 
Kai Winding - trombone
Ross Tompkins - piano
Dick Garcia - guitar (tracks 2, 7 & 11)
Russell George - bass
Tommy Check (tracks 3, 5, 9 & 10), Gus Johnson (tracks 1, 2, 4, 6-8 & 11) - drums

References 

1963 albums
Verve Records albums
Kai Winding albums
Albums produced by Creed Taylor